The Benton City – Kiona Bridge is a steel box girder and cable-stayed bridge carrying two lanes of Washington State Route 225 over the Yakima River in Benton City, Benton County, Washington. The first bridge was open by 1901, and the immediate predecessor bridge was closed and torn down in 1964. The bridge is owned and maintained by the Washington State Department of Transportation, and was added to the Washington Heritage Register on January 25, 2002.

Description 
The unincorporated community of Kiona is just south of concurrent highways Interstate 82 (I-82) / U.S. Route 12 (US 12), where SR 225 terminates. While SR 225 on both sides of the bridge features bicycle lanes, the bridge does not.

The bridge, as well as the remainder of SR 225 are considered a major collector road by the Washington State Department of Transportation (WSDOT), which the Federal Highway Administration defines as linking towns to larger arterials. Every year, WSDOT conducts a series of surveys on its highways in the state to measure traffic volume. This is expressed in terms of average annual daily traffic (AADT), a measure of traffic volume for any average day of the year. In 2012, WSDOT calculated that 9,500 vehicles traveled on SR-225 along the bridge.

History

Earlier spans 
The first span recorded was built by 1901. That bridge was destroyed during a flood along the Yakima River in late 1917. This bridge was recorded on the Pasco quadrangle produced by the United States Geological Survey in 1914. The letters "US" were inscribed in one of the approach spans of the bridge as a way marker for travelers through the region. Major flooding happened along the Yakima River near Benton City in 1894, 1917, 1922, 1933, and 1948. A new bridge was built after the original span collapsed in the flood. The second bridge was torn down in 1964, seven years after the opening of the current bridge.

Current span 
The first proposals for the current bridge were submitted in November 1955, with a cost estimate of $140 thousand (equivalent to $ in ). The bridge was designed so that there was a clearance of  higher than the 1933 Yakima River flood level. The second bridge had been in place for 40 years and was seeing an average of 1,700 cars-per-day over the bridge. By comparison 9,500 cars on an average 2012 day travel over the current bridge.

Everett McKellar of Chelan won the contract to build the bridge, designed by Homer M. Hadley in 1956. Hadley designed the Lacey V. Murrow Memorial Bridge across Lake Washington and the Third Lake Washington Bridge was named after him. The cost of the bridge came out at just over $196 thousand (equivalent to $ in ), and was opened to traffic on July 4, 1957.

The bridge is believed to be the first steel box girder bridge built in the United States.

The bridge was listed on the Washington Heritage Register on January 25, 2002.

See also

References

External links 

 OAHP inventory form

Bridges completed in 1957
Bridges in Benton County, Washington
Road bridges in Washington (state)
Washington Heritage Register
Cable-stayed bridges in the United States
Steel bridges in the United States
Box girder bridges in the United States
Yakima River